‘’’Laima’’’ is the goddess of fate in Lithuanian and Latvian mythologies.

‘’’Laima’’’ may also refer to:
Laima (confectioner), largest producer of confectionery in Latvia
Laima (given name), a Latvian and Lithuanian female given name
Insitu Aerosonde, unmanned aerial vehicle nicknamed after the goddess

See also
Lamia (disambiguation)